Odisha Crafts Museum also known as Kalabhoomi is a museum in Bhubaneswar, Odisha, India, dedicated to the art and crafts of Odisha. It was inaugurated by the Chief Minister of Odisha, Naveen Patnaik, on 22 March 2018. The museum is spread across 12.68 Acres of an area, divided into eight galleries, Open air amphitheater, workshop area and souvenir shop, and is designed by Architects' Studio, Bhubaneswar.

The museum celebrates the craftsmanship of Odia artisans by putting on display their breath-taking masterpieces. Divided into 2 blocks, the museum has a display area and a live section. The display area focuses on galleries about Handicrafts and Handlooms from around the state while the live section is equipped with an open air theatre as well as separate workshop zones. Kala Bhoomi is built using local raw materials such as the laterite stone which can still be seen in some of the oldest monuments around the state.
At Kala Bhoomi we have 10 galleries out of which 8 are open to the public.  The Handicrafts galleries are on Terracotta, Traditional Paintings, Stone and Wood carving, Natural material crafts and Tribal Crafts. The Handlooms galleries display unique and antique raw materials and equipment as well as variety of Handlooms from across the state.  Several handloom and handicraft items are very rare and over a 100-year-old

Galleries
Terracotta
Traditional Paintings
Stone and Woodcarving
Metal crafts
Natural Crafts
Tribal Crafts
Pre-weaving techniques and Cocoons
Handlooms
There are two more galleries dedicated to the crafts of Shree Jagannath Sanskruti and the Dance Forms of Odisha that are under construction.

Timings
Opening timing is 10:00 AM to 5:30 PM all days of the week.
It is closed on select National Holidays such as Independence Day, Deepawali/ Kali Puja, etc. The website contains list of approved holidays.

Gallery

References

Art museums and galleries in India
Museums in Bhubaneswar
Museums established in 2018
2018 establishments in Odisha